Praolia umui is a species of beetle in the family Cerambycidae. It was described by Kusama and Takakuwa in 1984.

References

Saperdini
Beetles described in 1984